This is a list of monuments and memorials to Terry Fox.

General

Buildings and structures

Media

Natural areas

Roads and transport

References

Terry Fox
Fox, Terry